Samuele Rivi (born 11 May 1998) is an Italian racing cyclist, who currently rides for UCI ProTeam .

Major results

2018
 8th Trofeo Città di San Vendemiano
2019
 1st Grand Prix Südkärnten
 2nd Trofeo Piva
 6th Gran Premio Industrie del Marmo
 8th GP Slovenian Istria
2021
 8th Trofeo Matteotti

Grand Tour general classification results timeline

References

External links

1998 births
Living people
Italian male cyclists
Sportspeople from Trento
Cyclists from Trentino-Alto Adige/Südtirol